George Dempster of Dunnichen and Skibo FRSE FSA (Scot) (1732–1818) was a Scottish advocate, landowner, agricultural improver and politician who sat in the House of Commons between 1761 and 1790. Dempster founded the bank George Dempster & Co. (also known as the Dundee Banking Company) in 1763, was a Director of the East India Company from 1769, and served as Provost of St Andrews (1780) and a Director of the Highland Society of Scotland (1789).

Dempster, nicknamed Honest George, was a key figure of the Scottish Enlightenment and respected as an "independently minded, incorruptible and moderately radical MP". He dedicated the later years of his life to improving Scottish fishing and agriculture and improving the living conditions of his tenants.

He was a lifelong friend of the philosopher Adam Ferguson and the minister Alexander Carlyle.

Life and work
George Dempster was born in 1732 in Dundee, the son of John Dempster 2nd Laird of Dunnichen (near Forfar), a Dundee merchant, and Isabel Ogilvie. George's date of birth is unclear, and has alternatively been given as 8 February or 8 December. He was educated at Dundee Grammar School (c1739–c1748) and possibly also at the small parish school at Leuchars, Fife. On 24 February 1748 he entered the University of St Andrews and studied there until about 1750, when he left without taking a degree and moved on to study law at the University of Edinburgh. He also studied at the Académie Royale in Brussels.

Dempster was admitted to the Faculty of Advocates in 1755; and about the same time became a member of the Select Society, later becoming a director of this pre-eminent literary and intellectual society of the Scottish Enlightenment. In 1762 he joined the Poker Club of Edinburgh, and may have been a co-founder of this influential body,

He, Andrew Erskine, and James Boswell were joint authors and a "triumvirate of wit", although he later regretted at least one of their attacks, the Critical Strictures on the New Tragedy of Elvira, as he believed the tragedy was better than anything he or his co-authors could have done.

He served as Member of Parliament for the Perth Burghs (1761-8 and 1769–90).

Dempster was elected a Fellow of the Royal Society of Edinburgh in 1788, upon the proposal of Dr Thomas Anderson, Henry Duncan and John Playfair.

He died at Dunnichen, Angus, on 13 February 1818, and was interred at Restenneth Priory, Forfar.

References 

 The Introduction to Critical Strictures on the New Tragedy of Elvira, Written by Mr. David Malloch (1763), by Frederick A. Pottle (Augustan Reprint Society, 1952).

External links

 Letters of George Dempster to Sir Adam Fergusson, 1756-1813. The Grimsay Press, 2004. 
 
 
 George Dempster at James Boswell – a Guide
 The Poker Club
 

1732 births
1818 deaths
18th-century Scottish businesspeople
19th-century Scottish businesspeople
18th-century Scottish lawyers
19th-century Scottish lawyers
People from Dundee
People from Angus, Scotland
People associated with Fife
People educated at the High School of Dundee
Alumni of the University of St Andrews
Alumni of the University of Edinburgh
Fellows of the Royal Society of Edinburgh
Provosts in Scotland
Directors of the British East India Company
Members of the Faculty of Advocates
Members of the Parliament of Great Britain for Scottish constituencies
People of the Scottish Enlightenment
Scottish agronomists
Scottish antiquarians
Scottish bankers
Scottish landowners
Scottish non-fiction writers
Lairds
British MPs 1761–1768
British MPs 1768–1774
British MPs 1774–1780
British MPs 1784–1790
Businesspeople from Dundee
Fellows of the Society of Antiquaries of Scotland